A Goodyear welt is a strip of leather, rubber, or plastic that runs along the perimeter of a shoe outsole. The machinery used for the process was invented in 1869 by Charles Goodyear Jr., the son of Charles Goodyear. It has been noted by historians that Goodyear was a frequent visitor to the shoe factory of William J. Dudley, founder of Johnston & Murphy, where early work on sole stitching equipment was performed.

Construction
"Goodyear welt construction" involves stitching a welt to the upper and a strip of preformed canvas like a "rib" that runs all around and bottom (known as "gemming") cemented to the insole of a shoe as an attach-point for the outsole or midsole (depending on the Goodyear welt variant). The space enclosed by the welt is then filled with cork or some other filler material such as foam (usually either porous or perforated, for breathability and cushioning), and the outsole is both cemented and stitched to the welt. Shoes with other types of construction may also have welts.

Process
The Goodyear welt process is a machine-based alternative to the traditional hand-welted method (c. 1500) for the manufacture of men's shoes, allowing them to be resoled repeatedly.

The upper part of the shoe is shaped over the last and fastened on by sewing a leather, linen or synthetic strip (also known as the "welt") to the inner and upper sole. As well as using a welt, stitching holds the material firmly together.

The welt forms a cavity which is then filled with a cork material. The final part of the shoe is the sole, which is attached to the welt by some combination of stitching and a high strength adhesive like contact cement or hide glue. The result is highly valued for being relatively waterproof by minimizing water penetration into the insole and the relative ease of resoling as long as the upper remains viable. Welted shoes are more expensive to manufacture than those mass-produced by automated machinery with molded soles.

References

Further reading
R.A. Salaman, The Dictionary of Leather-Working Tools c. 1700-1950, Allen & Unwin, London 1986. pp. 182  
J.H. Thornton, Northampton College of Technology, Textbook of Footwear Manufacture, pps. 28-32, National Trade Press, UK 1953
F.Y. Golding, edited by, Boots and Shoes, Vol. VI,  pp. 178 The New Era Publishing, London 1936

External links
Video: How Goodyear Welted Shoes are made USA ca. 1930
pdf Document: The manufacture of boots and shoes : being a modern treatise of all the processes of making and manufacturing footgear (1902)
pdf Document: Original Goodyear Welt Patent 1869
3D Animation Goodyear Welted Patent

Footwear components